Olgiate-Calco-Brivio is a railway station in Italy. Located on the Lecco–Milan railway, it serves the municipalities of Olgiate Molgora, Calco and Brivio.

Services
Olgiate-Calco-Brivio is served by S8 line of the Milan suburban railway service, operated by the Lombard railway company Trenord.

See also
 Milan suburban railway service
 Olgiate Molgora
 Line S8
 Milan metropolitan area

Notes

External links

Railway stations in Lombardy
Milan S Lines stations
Railway stations opened in 1873